William N. Egerton  (1891–1934) was an English footballer who played in the Football League for Bolton Wanderers and Lincoln City.

References

1891 births
1934 deaths
Sportspeople from Cheshire
English footballers
Association football forwards
Chesterfield F.C. players
Bolton Wanderers F.C. players
Lincoln City F.C. players
Mid Rhondda F.C. players
English Football League players